Xavier James Silas (born January 22, 1988) is an American former professional basketball player and current head coach for the Mets de Guaynabo of the Baloncesto Superior Nacional, the main professional basketball league in Puerto Rico. He played college basketball for the University of Colorado at Boulder and Northern Illinois University.

High school and college career
Silas grew up in Austin, Texas where he attended Stephen F. Austin High School before moving to Wolfeboro, New Hampshire to attend Brewster Academy for a postgraduate year. In 2005–06, he averaged 12.8 points and 4.0 rebounds per game for Brewster Academy.

After playing two seasons for Colorado, Silas transferred to Northern Illinois in 2008 and subsequently sat out the 2008–09 season due to NCAA transfer regulations. As a senior for Northern Illinois in 2010–11, Silas was named to the All-Mid-American Conference first team after he averaged 22.3 points (1st in the MAC) and 4.6 rebounds per game.

Professional career

2011–12 season
Silas went undrafted in the 2011 NBA draft. On September 16, 2011, he signed a one-year deal with BCM Gravelines of the LNB Pro A. In early December 2011, he left France and returned to the United States.

On December 9, 2011, he signed with the Philadelphia 76ers. However, he was later waived by the 76ers on December 20, 2011. A week later, he was acquired by the Maine Red Claws. On April 24, 2012, he signed with the 76ers for the rest of the season.

2012–13 season
In July 2012, Silas joined the Philadelphia 76ers for the 2012 NBA Summer League. In the 76ers' final summer league game against the Detroit Pistons, Silas left the game after he was inadvertently elbowed in the head by teammate Solomon Jones. Silas went down with a concussion, and the Sixers initially feared a skull fracture. He subsequently required surgery on several sinus fractures.

On September 27, 2012, he re-signed with the 76ers. However, he was later waived on October 10, 2012. On November 1, 2012, he was reacquired by the Maine Red Claws. On February 18, 2013, he was deactivated by the Red Claws and stayed that way for the rest of the season.

2013–14 season
In July 2013, Silas joined the Milwaukee Bucks for the 2013 NBA Summer League. On September 27, 2013, he signed with the Washington Wizards. However, he was later waived by the Wizards on October 24, 2013. On November 4, 2013, the Maine Red Claws traded Silas' rights to the Fort Wayne Mad Ants.

On November 17, 2013, he signed with Maccabi Ashdod of Israel for the rest of the 2013–14 season. On January 16, 2014, he left Maccabi after just nine games. On February 11, 2014, he signed with Quimsa of Argentina for the rest of the season.

2014–15 season
On September 29, 2014, Silas signed with the Washington Wizards. However, he was later waived by the Wizards on October 25, 2014. On January 7, 2015, he signed with Nea Kifissia of Greece for the rest of the season.

2015–16 season
On August 25, 2015, Silas signed with Telekom Baskets Bonn of Germany for the 2015–16 season. On November 12, he parted ways with Telekom Bonn after appearing in five league games and four Eurocup games.

On November 19, Silas signed with San Lorenzo de Almagro of the Argentine Liga Nacional de Básquet. On December 23, he parted ways with San Lorenzo after averaging 12.4 points and 3.7 rebounds in seven games.

On January 14, 2016, Silas was acquired by the Bakersfield Jam of the NBA Development League. That night, he made his debut for the Jam in a 105–100 loss to the Austin Spurs, recording six points in 19 minutes off the bench.

2016–17 season
After being inactive for seven games, Silas made his debut with the Northern Arizona Suns (the new name for the Bakersfield Jam) on December 3, 2016, against the Reno Bighorns.

On April 6, 2017, Silas signed with the Hunan Yongsheng of China for the 2017 NBL season. However, he did not join the Chinese club.

2017–18 season
After concluding his season with the BIG3 (a 3-on-3 basketball league created by Ice Cube), Silas returned to the Northern Arizona Suns once again on October 24, 2017. On March 27, 2018, after the conclusion of the first NBA G League season, the Boston Celtics announced that they had signed Silas to a 10-day contract after the team granted hardship exception from the league. The Celtics did not resign him after the contract expired.

2018–19 season
Silas signed with the Denver Nuggets to a training camp contract but was waived on October 13, 2018. Silas was added to the Iowa Wolves opening night roster.

BIG3
On April 30, 2017, Silas was drafted as the 4th overall pick in the inaugural draft for the BIG3 basketball league by Tri State. Silas played three games with Tri State before being traded to the Ball Hogs on July 13, 2017 in exchange for Dominic McGuire.

Coaching career
For the 2019–20 season, Silas joined the coaching staff for the Delaware Blue Coats as an assistant and before

Before the 2021–22 season, Silas became an assistant coach for the Motor City Cruise.

Career statistics

NBA

Regular season

|-
| style="text-align:left;"| 
| style="text-align:left;"| Philadelphia
| 2 || 0 || 19.4 || .267 || .167 || .667 || 2.0 || 1.5 || .0 || .0 || 5.5
|-
| style="text-align:left;"| 
| style="text-align:left;"| Boston
| 2 || 0 || 3.7 || .000 || .000 || – || 1.0 || .0 || .5 || .0 || .0
|-
| style="text-align:left;"| Career
| style="text-align:left;"| 
| 4 || 0 || 11.5 || .222 || .125 || .667 || 1.5 || .8 || .3 || .0 || 2.8

Playoffs

|-
| style="text-align:left;"| 2012
| style="text-align:left;"| Philadelphia
| 2 || 0 || 2.0 || 1.000 || .000 || .000 || 1.0 || .0 || .0 || .0 || 1.0

Personal life
Silas is the son of James and Vanessa Silas, and has six brothers and one sister. His father was a two-time All-American at Stephen F. Austin and played 328 games in four seasons in the American Basketball Association (ABA), where he averaged 18.2 points, 4.3 assists and 4.0 rebounds per game. He also played six seasons in the NBA for the San Antonio Spurs after the ABA–NBA merger and one for the Cleveland Cavaliers, averaging 14.2 points per game.

References

External links
Northern Illinois Huskies bio
NBA G League profile
Eurobasket.com profile

1988 births
Living people
African-American basketball players
American expatriate basketball people in Argentina
American expatriate basketball people in France
American expatriate basketball people in Germany
American expatriate basketball people in Israel
American men's basketball players
Bakersfield Jam players
Basketball coaches from Texas
Basketball players from Austin, Texas
Basketball players from San Antonio
BCM Gravelines players
Big3 players
Boston Celtics players
Brewster Academy alumni
Colorado Buffaloes men's basketball players
Delaware Blue Coats coaches
Iowa Wolves players
Maccabi Ashdod B.C. players
Maine Red Claws players
Motor City Cruise coaches
Nea Kifissia B.C. players
Northern Arizona Suns players
Northern Illinois Huskies men's basketball players
Philadelphia 76ers players
Point guards
Shooting guards
Sportspeople from Austin, Texas
Sportspeople from San Antonio
Telekom Baskets Bonn players
Undrafted National Basketball Association players
United States men's national basketball team players
21st-century African-American sportspeople
20th-century African-American people
American men's 3x3 basketball players